Sanjiv Mehta may refer to:

 Sanjiv Mehta (Indian businessman), Chairman & Managing Director of Hindustan Unilever Limited (Unilever's Indian subsidiary)
 Sanjiv Mehta (British businessman), founder of The East India Company established in 2010